The 1996 Southland Conference baseball tournament was held from May 16 to 19, 1996 to determine the champion of the Southland Conference in the sport of college baseball for the 1996 season.  The event pitted the top six finishers from the conference's regular season in a double-elimination tournament held at Fair Grounds Field in Shreveport, Louisiana.  Fourth-seeded  won their first championship and claimed the automatic bid to the 1996 NCAA Division I baseball tournament.

Seeding and format
The top six finishers from the regular season were seeded one through six.  They played a double-elimination tournament.

Bracket and results

All-Tournament Team
The following players were named to the All-Tournament Team.

Most Valuable Player
Brent Bubela was named Tournament Most Valuable Player.  Buebla was a designated hitter for Sam Houston State.

References

Tournament
Southland Conference Baseball Tournament
Southland Conference baseball tournament
Southland Conference baseball tournament